Krivoarbatsky Lane (from Russian "", krivoy, meaning "curved") is a small sidestreet near the Arbat Street. It is most notable for its curved form and the Wall of Viktor Tsoi, a Russian musician.  This street is also notable for some informal youth gatherings.

Streets in Moscow
Arbat District